Michael Andrew Marsh (born 21 July 1969) is an English football coach and former professional player.

Marsh came through the ranks at Liverpool and was part of their 1992 FA Cup-winning side. He notably played in the Premier League for The Reds as well as West Ham United and Coventry City before a spell in Turkey with Galatasaray. He went on to play in the Football League with Southend United and then in Non-League with Southport, Barrow, Kidderminster Harriers, Boston United and Accrington Stanley.

Marsh moved into management and had spells in charge of Burscough, Bradford Park Avenue and Northwich Victoria.He was a first-team coach at Liverpool between 2011 and 2015, working under Kenny Dalglish and Brendan Rodgers, before joining Huddersfield Town as a coach in November 2015. He left in May 2016 to take up a coaching role with the England under-17s, and was an assistant coach at Swansea City between 2019 and 2021.

Playing career

Liverpool
A midfielder or full-back, he was spotted playing for his local side Kirkby Town by Liverpool reserve team coach Phil Thompson, who advised manager Kenny Dalglish to sign the talented youngster, which he did on 21 August 1987. Marsh made his Liverpool debut on 1 March 1989 in the 2–0 win over Charlton Athletic at Anfield, when he came on as a 58th-minute substitute for Jan Mølby.

Marsh graduated from the reserves and established himself as a first-team regular in the 1991–92 season. His first goal also came during this season, in one of the most memorable matches ever played at Anfield, on 6 November 1991 in a UEFA Cup second round second leg tie against Auxerre. The game saw Liverpool turn a 2–0 deficit from the first leg in France into a 3–2 aggregate win. Marsh's 29th-minute equaliser swung the game in Liverpool's favour.

Marsh was an unused substitute in the 1992 FA Cup Final and picked up a winners medal as Liverpool beat Sunderland 2–0. He continued to be a regular squad member in 1992–93 and began the 1993–94 season in style with a great curled goal in a 5–0 win at Swindon Town, but Graeme Souness allowed him to leave within days of that goal when he joined West Ham United as a makeweight (along with David Burrows) in the deal that took Julian Dicks to Anfield. Marsh had appeared 101 times for Liverpool and scored six goals.

West Ham United
Marsh signed for West Ham United on 17 September 1993 and made his debut the following day in the 2–0 win over Blackburn Rovers at Ewood Park. Marsh's time at Upton Park was short-lived. He spent fifteen months at the club, during which he made 61 appearances, scoring twice.

Coventry City
Coventry City signed Marsh for £450,000 on 30 December 1994 but he was soon on the move again after nineteen games and two goals in six months at Highfield Road.

Galatasaray
It was the manager who had allowed him to leave Liverpool, Graeme Souness, who wanted Marsh's signature. He got it for £500,000 on 26 June 1995, taking Marsh to Turkish side Galatasaray. Marsh played three times in two and a half months for the team from Istanbul before he was on the move yet again to Southend United, whose newly installed manager was Marsh's ex-Liverpool teammate Ronnie Whelan.

Southend United
Marsh signed for the Shrimpers on 3 September 1995 for £500,000. Marsh made his debut on 9 September 1995 in the 1–0 defeat to Sunderland at Roker Park. Marsh had two good seasons at the Essex club, appearing in seventy-five league games and scoring ten times. The second of these seasons saw Southend relegated to the Second Division, the third tier of English football. Things got worse for Marsh as he picked up a knee injury which ultimately and prematurely ended his professional career. He had played ninety seven times for Southend, scoring thirteen goals.

Barrow and Kidderminster Harriers
As part of the insurance payout Marsh received when he retired, he was required to never play league football again, so he spent the remainder of his playing career in non-league. The first non-league side he signed for was Barrow, where he stayed for six months before moving to the ambitious Midlands club Kidderminster Harriers on 19 November 1999. Kidderminster were managed by former Liverpool teammate, and the man Marsh had replaced when making his debut, Jan Mølby.

The Harriers were in the Conference looking to gain league status for the first time in the club's history. They achieved their dream by the end of Marsh's first season for the club, but due to the terms of the insurance claim, Marsh could not follow Mølby and his teammates into league football and had to leave after 24 league appearances, in which he hit the net four times.

Southport
Marsh joined Conference side Southport on a free transfer on 18 May 2000 and spent just over a year there, playing 37 times and scoring seven times.

Boston United
On 9 June 2001, Marsh joined another ambitious Conference outfit, this time Boston United, who paid Southport £15,000. Marsh's experience helped guide Boston to the Conference title, but once again he had to leave as he was not allowed to join his Boston teammates in league football. He played seven times for Boston, scoring once against Chester, but was a major influence within the Boston camp.

Accrington Stanley
Marsh's last move was to another ambitious club, Accrington Stanley. Accrington won the Northern Premier League that season, thus gaining promotion to the Conference. Marsh ended his career after one season at the Crown Ground on 2 June 2003.

Coaching career
After retiring from playing, Marsh was on the coaching staff of Southport. In 2008, Northwich Victoria appointed him as their first-team coach. He quit Northwich to become assistant manager at Bradford Park Avenue in November 2008. Later that month, he was appointed caretaker manager of Park Avenue after Dave Cameron resigned following a defeat against bottom-placed Witton Albion, he shared the role with goalkeeping coach Gary Stokes because he had commitments in Spain.

Marsh is currently the head academy coach of Accrington & Rossendale College in East Lancashire. Marsh combines this role with his academy coaching job at Liverpool's under-16's and with his Master's football commitments. In May 2011 Liverpool announced he was to move up to coaching the under-18 side. Marsh moved up to first-team coach at Liverpool before his departure from the club was announced in June 2015.

On 9 November 2015, Marsh joined Huddersfield Town as a coach under new manager David Wagner.

In March 2016, it was announced that Marsh would leave Huddersfield to take up a similar position with the England national under-17 football team.

On 13 June 2019, Marsh was named assistant first-team coach to Steve Cooper at Swansea City.

In December 2021, he returned to his North West roots to become the new first team coach to Ryan Lowe at Preston North End.

Honours
1991–92 FA Cup with Liverpool
1999-00 Football Conference with Kidderminster Harriers
2001–02 Football Conference with Boston United
2002–03 Northern Premier League with Accrington Stanley

References

External links
 LFChistory.net player profile

Mike Marsh index at Sporting-heroes.net

1969 births
Living people
English footballers
English expatriate footballers
Association football midfielders
Liverpool F.C. players
Coventry City F.C. players
Galatasaray S.K. footballers
Southend United F.C. players
Barrow A.F.C. players
Kidderminster Harriers F.C. players
Boston United F.C. players
Accrington Stanley F.C. players
West Ham United F.C. players
Southport F.C. players
Premier League players
English Football League players
National League (English football) players
Northwich Victoria F.C. players
Bradford (Park Avenue) A.F.C. managers
Northwich Victoria F.C. managers
Süper Lig players
Expatriate footballers in Turkey
Footballers from Liverpool
Burscough F.C. managers
Knowsley United F.C. players
Liverpool F.C. non-playing staff
Huddersfield Town A.F.C. non-playing staff
English football managers
Swansea City A.F.C. non-playing staff
Preston North End F.C. non-playing staff